Timothy Thomas Ansberry (December 24, 1871 – July 5, 1943) was a U.S. Representative from Ohio.

Early life
Timothy T. Ansberry was born in Defiance, Ohio. He attended public schools. He graduated from the University of Notre Dame, South Bend, Indiana, in June 1893. He was admitted to the bar and commenced practice in Defiance, Ohio.

Career

Ansberry served as the Justice of the Peace from 1893 to 1895. He served as prosecuting attorney of Defiance County, Ohio from 1895 to 1903. He was an unsuccessful candidate for election in 1904 to the Fifty-ninth Congress.

Ansberry was elected as a Democrat to the Sixtieth and to the three succeeding Congresses and served from March 4, 1907, until January 9, 1915, when he resigned to accept a judicial position. He served as chairman of the Committee on Elections No. 1 (Sixty-second Congress). He was appointed associate judge of the Ohio Court of Appeals, in which capacity he served until his resignation in 1916.
He served as delegate to the 1920 Democratic National Convention at San Francisco and the 1924 Democratic National Convention at New York.

Ansberry was a presidential elector in the 1916 presidential election.

He moved to Washington, D.C., in 1916 and engaged in the practice of law until his death.

Death

Ansberry died in New York City on July 5, 1943. He was interred in Mount Olivet Cemetery in Washington, D.C.

References

Sources

External links

1871 births
1943 deaths
People from Defiance, Ohio
University of Notre Dame alumni
Burials at Mount Olivet Cemetery (Washington, D.C.)
County district attorneys in Ohio
Democratic Party members of the United States House of Representatives from Ohio
Lawyers from Washington, D.C.
1916 United States presidential electors